

Jim Carlson (August 29, 1932 – August 25, 2007) was an American film and television writer. He has been involved in shows like Rowan & Martin's Laugh-In, Emergency!, CHiPs and Battlestar Galactica, Spiral Zone, Beetlejuice, X-Men, the movie Pound Puppies and the Legend of Big Paw, and an ABC special based on The Mouse and the Motorcycle. He often collaborated with writer Terrence McDonnell.

Screenwriting credits

Television
 series head writer denoted in bold
 Lancelot Link, Secret Chimp (1970)
 Rowan & Martin’s Laugh-In (1970)
 Adam-12 (1973)
 Emergency! (1975)
 The Jeffersons (1975)
 Gemini Man (1976)
 The Six Million Dollar Man (1976)
 Battlestar Galactica (1978)
 CHiPs (1978)
 The Bionic Woman (1978)
 The Life and Times of Grizzly Adams (1978)
 Magnum, P.I. (1981)
 Kidd Video (1984)
 The Love Boat (1984)
 Riptide (1985)
 The Mouse and the Motorcycle (1986)
 Spiral Zone (1987)
 Good Morning, Miss Bliss (1989)
 The New Adventures of He-Man (1990)
 Peter Pan & the Pirates (1991)
 James Bond Jr. (1991)
 Goof Troop (1992)
 X-Men (1992)
 The Pink Panther (1993)
 Exosquad (1994)

Films
 Dorothy Meets Ozma of Oz (1987)
 Pound Puppies and the Legend of Big Paw (1988)

External links

American male screenwriters
1932 births
2007 deaths
20th-century American male writers
20th-century American screenwriters